Gujranwala City  is a tehsil of Gujranwala District, Punjab, Pakistan. The population is 259,556 according to the 2017 Census of Pakistan.

References

Gujranwala District
Tehsils of Punjab, Pakistan